The Fiumicicoli (or Rivière u Fiumicicoli) is a river in the southeast of the department of Corse-du-Sud, Corsica, France. It is a tributary of the river Rizzanese.

Course

It crosses the communes of Carbini, Levie, Mela, Olmiccia, San-Gavino-di-Carbini, Sainte-Lucie-de-Tallano and Zonza.
Its source is in the commune of Zonza to the west of the  Monte Calva.
It flows in a generally southwest direction past the villages or hamlets of Carbona, Giglio, Gualdariccio and Carbini, then turns to the west to pass under the D69 road and join the Rizzanese to the southeast of Arbellara.

Tributaries
The following streams (ruisseaux) are tributaries of the Fiumicicoli (ordered by length) and sub-tributaries:

 Salvatica: 
 Leva: 
 San Polu: 
 Mezzane: 
 Ciscia: 
 Casavecchia: 
 Petra Grossa: 
 Vacca Morta: 
 Lamaja: 
 Giallitaju: 
 Vigne d'Allandi: 
 Pagnanesa: 
 Canale: 
 Petre Late: 
 Ormellu: 
 Fiorentina: 
 Vitte Grosse: 
 Buri: 
 Tunau: 
 Culumbella:

Notes

Sources

Rivers of Corse-du-Sud
Rivers of France